The 1925 Hammond Pros season was their sixth in the league. The team failed to improve on their previous record against league opponents of 2–2–1, winning only one game. They finished fourteenth in the league.

Schedule

 Game in italics is against a non-NFL team.

Standings

References

Hammond Pros seasons
Hammond Pros
1925 in sports in Indiana